HMS Sulphur was a 10-gun  of the British Royal Navy, famous as one of the ships in which Edward Belcher explored the Pacific coast of the Americas.

Ship history

Sulphur was launched in 1826, and in 1829 carried Lieutenant-Colonel Frederick Irwin, officers, passengers and a detachment of troops from the 63rd Regiment of Foot to the Swan River Colony. Medina had grounded while delivering immigrants.

Sulphur was converted into a survey ship in 1835 together with  sailed to the Pacific Ocean. Captain Frederick Beechey commanded the expedition under orders to survey the Pacific coast "from Valparaíso to 63°30' N." By the time the ship reached Valparaíso on 9 June 1836 however, Beechey became too ill to continue leading the vessel and departed for the United Kingdom. Henry Kellett replaced Beechey and sailed for Panama City where the expedition waited for a replacement officer. Edward Belcher arrived at the port in March 1837 as the new officer and the expedition continued its operations, sailing for the Federal Republic of Central America.

Sulphur reached the capital of Russian America New Archangel, on 11 September where Governor Ivan Kupreyanov greeted the British with a colonial ball. After departing south, Sulphur reached the site of the first Nootka Convention, Yuquot, on 3 October. After meeting with local Nuu-chah-nulth dignitaries, the British vessel then went to the mouth of the Columbia River. Bad weather prevented the ship from visited from Fort Vancouver and instead sailed south for Yerba Buena in Alta California. Sulphur returned to the Columbia River on 28 July 1839. After visiting Fort Vancouver the expedition went south, reaching San Blas on 24 November, where it remained until December. Sailing for the Marquesas Islands, Sulphur reached the archipelago in January 1840.

She participated in the First Opium War between 1840 and 1841.

On 21 July 1841, HMS Sulphur was damaged in the 1841 Hong Kong typhoon resulting in her total dismasting.

The ship was used to survey the harbour of Hong Kong in 1841 and returned to England in 1842. She was used for harbour service from 1843, and was broken up by 20 November 1859, by then the last bomb vessel on the Navy List.

Richard Brinsley Hinds (1811-1846) served as surgeon on Sulphur 1835-42. He was a naturalist, and collected numerous samples of plants and marine animals for study. He edited  and The Zoology of the Voyage of H.M.S. Sulphur (1844). The introduction to Zoology, Volume 1 provides a detailed description of the voyage.

Sulphur Channel on the north shore of Hong Kong Island was named after the ship.

See also
 European and American voyages of scientific exploration
 List of bomb vessels of the Royal Navy

Notes

References

External links
 
 Zoomable image of Belcher's Map of Hong Kong
Blecher, Edward. Narrative of a Voyage round the World performed in H.M.S. Sulphur, 1836-1842. Vol. 2

1826 ships
Bomb vessels of the Royal Navy
Exploration ships of the United Kingdom
History of Western Australia
First Opium War ships of the United Kingdom